Jagodnik  is a village in the administrative district of Gmina Cmolas, within Kolbuszowa County, Subcarpathian Voivodeship, in south-eastern Poland.

The appropriate population of the village is 500

References

Jagodnik